The 1972–73 Japan Ice Hockey League season was the seventh season of the Japan Ice Hockey League. Five teams participated in the league, and the Seibu Tetsudo won the championship.

Regular season

External links
 Japan Ice Hockey Federation

Japan
Japan Ice Hockey League seasons
Japan